Brian Lara International Cricket 2007 is a cricket video game from Codemasters available on PlayStation 2, PC and Xbox 360. It is endorsed by West Indian cricketer Brian Lara. It is the sequel to Brian Lara International Cricket 2005. It was released on 23 March 2007 during the 2007 Cricket World Cup.

The game was released in Australia and New Zealand under the name of Ricky Ponting International Cricket 2007 and in India as Yuvraj Singh International Cricket 2007.

Gameplay
There are several game modes, such as ICC World Cup, Test matches, One Day Internationals, ICC Champions Trophy, Twenty20, Bowling, Fielding, Batting practice as well as net practice sliced in with 16 tutorial mini games. It is the first cricket video game to have online play included.

Commentary is provided by Jonathan Agnew, David Gower, Ian Bishop, Bill Lawry and Tony Greig.

Release

Codemasters Open Day
Codemasters held an open day in October 2006 which was attended by six staff members at PlanetCricket and one member from the Codemasters forum. The seven were shown the game being developed as well as given a demo of the current alpha build. Another open day was planned for 2 March 2007 where gamers got the chance to try out the new game.

Demo
On 9 March 2007, Codemasters released a playable demo of Brian Lara International Cricket 2007. The demo allowed the player to complete 3 overs of batting and bowling using the national cricket teams of England and Australia. It was available for download from the official website for PC users, and the Xbox Live Marketplace for Xbox 360 users.

Reception
Initial reviews of Brian Lara International Cricket 2007 were mixed. The game was viewed as a solid replacement for Brian Lara International Cricket 2005 with improvements in most areas. There was criticism, where reviewers complained of a lack of improvement in the graphics despite being a next generation game, and the gameplay being too easy. Other reviews commented on how the game might not appeal to non cricket fans. Also criticised is the lack of statistical tracking that occurs during television coverage of cricket despite claims it emulates the coverage well. The game has been praised for its relatively realistic simulation of real cricket.

References

External links
Official Brian Lara International Cricket 2007 webpage

2007 video games
Brian Lara video games
Cricket video games
Codemasters games
PlayStation 2 games
Xbox 360 games
Windows games
Video games set in India
Video games set in New Zealand
Video games developed in the United Kingdom
Multiplayer and single-player video games